Czech Extraliga is an annual autumn-winter tennis tournament for clubs from the Czech Republic. I.ČLTK Praha are the current champions.

Champions by year

References 

Tennis in the Czech Republic
Tennis leagues